Parrassaurus is an ophthalmosaurid ichthyosaur from the late Jurassic La Caja Formation of Mexico found in 2021. Parrassaurus includes one species, Parrassaurus yacahuitztli.

References 

Ophthalmosauridae
Late Jurassic ichthyosaurs
Fossil taxa described in 2021
Ichthyosauromorph genera